Dolly Jain is a saree and dupatta draper in Kolkata.

Early life 

Dolly Jain was born and raised in Bengaluru, Karnataka.

Career 
Dolly Jain became interested in saree draping after her marriage, when she was required to wear a saree herself. She learnt a variety of draping styles and taught them to other women, and was also asked to help brides with the draping of their wedding saree. Designer Sandeep Khosla recommended her to celebrity clients, and she eventually decided to pursue it as a career.

In 2019, she submitted a record to the Limca Book of Records, and was credited for draping a saree in 325 different ways and taking as low as 18.5 seconds to drape a saree. She draped the wedding outfits of Sonam Kapoor, Deepika Padukone, Priyanka Chopra, and Isha Ambani.

References 

Living people
Indian women fashion designers
Fashion stylists
Year of birth missing (living people)